, also known as CLAMP Campus Detectives, is a manga series by Clamp, which was adapted into a 26-episode anime series, produced by Bandai Visual and Studio Pierrot. The manga series was serialized in Kadokawa Shoten's Monthly Asuka manga magazine between January 1992 and October 1993, spanning three tankōbon, while the anime premiered in Japan on TV Tokyo between May 3, 1997 and October 25, 1997.

An early work of the all-female manga artist group Clamp, the series outlines the adventures of the Elementary School Student Board in their attempt to better the lives of the female population of Clamp School.

Tokyopop have released the manga in English across North America in three volumes. Now it's currently available on Kindle through Viz Media. Bandai Entertainment released the anime as one of their initial titles. It is now licensed by Maiden Japan. The anime series has been translated and dubbed into English by the anime television network, Animax, who have broadcast the series across its respective English-language networks in Southeast Asia and India.

Plot
The Clamp School Detectives is a series of episodic cases.

Characters

Main characters
 
 A 6th grade student and the elementary school board chairman. The youngest son of the Imonoyama zaibatsu, the founders of Clamp School, he has inherited the family fondness of doing absurd things just for the sake of doing them. Nokoru has one of the top IQs in a school full of geniuses and NASA has been vying for the mind of the elementary schooler. He also has the unique ability to detect a lady in distress from two kilometers away. He is also infamous for being a flirt. For this reason, he established the Clamp School Detective Agency, although this was also an incentive to get out of his chairman duties. He is also the only one out of the three young detectives that doesn't play a sport. Nokoru also appears in Clamp's Duklyon: Clamp School Defenders, Man of Many Faces, Tsubasa: Reservoir Chronicle and X/1999. 
 
 A 5th grader and the elementary school board secretary. Suoh is a martial arts expert, with a 3rd dan blackbelt in Karate, Judo, Aikido, and Kendo (he would have gone higher, but he ran out of competition), he's also good in kyūdō. He is also the descendant of a Japanese ninja clan, and has sworn to protect Nokoru through anything. Suoh first met Nokoru three years prior (him being in 2nd grade) to the story but at first he was avoiding Nokoru. S is also responsible for making sure the chairman does all of his paperwork on time. Suoh is in love with Nagisa. Suoh also appears in Clamp School Paranormal Investigators, Man of Many Faces, Tsubasa: Reservoir Chronicle and X/1999. 
 
 A 4th grader and the elementary school board treasurer. Akira is a first-class chef, a trait he inherited from his father. He lives with his two mothers and has also inherited his father's legacy as the notorious thief 20 Masks. Akira is in love with Utako. Akira also appears in Clamp's Man of Many Faces, Duklyon: Clamp School Defenders, Tsubasa: Reservoir Chronicle and X/1999.

Supporting characters
 
 A kindergarten student and friend of the president of the Kindergarten Student Division Council, she plays the flute very beautifully. At first, Suoh thought that she was a wisteria fairy and an illusion; after hearing Utako Ohkawa talk about her, however, he knew she was real. Her mother is a famous traditional Japanese dancer and her father is well known for playing for royalty. She has enough talent to surpass her parents. Suoh has a crush on her and vice versa. 
 
 A kindergarten student and president of the Kindergarten Student Division Council. At first, she thought that her friend, Nagisa, was being attacked by people who are jealous of her. Akira has a crush on her and vice versa. She believes they will get married someday. She has an older sister named Mako. She also appears in Clamp's Man of Many Faces and makes a cameo appearance in Tsubasa: Reservoir Chronicle. 
 Takeshi Shukaido
 Takeshi is a high school freshman at the CLAMP School High School Division, part of homeroom Z. He practices kendo and won the championship his freshman year. He was asked to be one of the Duklyon Defenders after winning the championship along with Kentaro.
Takeshi has a more serious personality and is quick to anger over the mistakes and antics of Kentaro. He comes from a poor family and works in order to earn money. When asked, he is quick to deny having any relationship with Kentaro.

Media

Manga

Anime

An anime adaptation directed by Osamu Nabeshima and produced by the animation studio Pierrot aired in Japan on TV Tokyo for 26 episodes from May 3, 1997 to October 25, 1997. Bandai Visual released the series on 13 VHS and LD volumes and in a DVD box. The anime was licensed by Bandai Entertainment as one of their launching titles and released the anime on subtitled VHS under the AnimeVillage label. Bandai eventually re-released the series on DVD with an English dub produced by Coastal Studios. Maiden Japan has since relicensed the series; they re-released it on DVD on September 13, 2016.

References

External links
 Clamp School Detectives at the Internet Movie Database
 Pierrot's official Clamp School website
 

1992 manga
1997 anime television series debuts
Bandai Entertainment anime titles
Bandai Visual
Works by Clamp (manga artists)
Comedy anime and manga
Crossover anime and manga
Fictional detective agencies
Kadokawa Shoten manga
Kadokawa Dwango franchises
Maiden Japan
Pierrot (company)
Tokyopop titles
TV Tokyo original programming
Viz Media manga